is one of the eleven wards in the city of Kyoto, in Kyoto Prefecture, Japan. It lies in the southeastern part of the city, and Yamashina Station is one stop away from Kyoto Station on the Tōkaidō Main Line (Biwako Line). The area of Yamashina-ku is 28.70 km².  the population of Yamashina-ku was 134,253.

Historically, Yamashina was an important point for traffic connecting Kyoto and east part of Japan. In the Edo period, it flourished as a post town along the Tōkaidō road. In modern times, Yamashina has become a bed town for those commuting to urban areas of Kyoto and Osaka.

Demographics

Economy
Ohsho Food Service, the operator of Gyoza no Ohsho, is headquartered in the ward.

Education
Kyoto Pharmaceutical University
Kyoto Tachibana University

Sightseeing spots

Yamashina-ku is the location of the tomb of Emperor Tenji, the oldest Imperial tomb in Kyoto. The grave of Sakanoue no Tamuramaro is also here. The Lake Biwa Canal passes through the ward. Yamashina is home to the Ōishi Shrine and several noteworthy temples.

the tomb of Emperor Tenji
the tomb of Sakanoue no Tamuramaro
The Lake Biwa Canal
Ansho-ji
Oishi shrine
Kajū-ji
Zuishin-in
Bishamon-do
Honkoku-ji
Yamashina shrine
Iwaya shrine
Yamashina-Hongan-ji
Nakatomi-shrine

People from Yamashina
Yoshikazu Kura (baseball player)
Tomoko Nakajima (comedian, tsukkomi role in Othello
Naomi Fujiyama (actress)

References

External links

  

Wards of Kyoto